Elections were held in Illinois on Tuesday, November 8, 1994. Primaries were held on March 15, 1994.

These elections saw the Republican Party make significant gains, and conversely saw the Democratic Party see significant losses. The Republican Party captured the State House and retained control of the State Senate and, winning them a trifecta of state government control. The Republican Party additionally won all statewide executive offices, retaining the governorship and office of lieutenant governor in their combined election, retaining the office of Secretary of State, while also flipping the offices of Attorney General, Comptroller, and Treasurer.  The Republican Party also gained two more of Illinois' U.S. congressional seats. 

The result of the election marked the first time since the 1950s that all executive offices and control of the Illinois General Assembly were held by a single party (the previous time had also seen the Republican Party reach this feat).

Election information
1994 was a midterm election year in the United States.

The 1994 midterm elections saw a strong national showing by the Republican Party, which was dubbed the Republican Revolution.

Turnout
For the primaries, turnout was 31.91%, with 1,963,606 ballots cast (with 1,186,888 Democratic ballots, 729,372 Republican ballots, 674 Harold Washington, and 46,619 nonpartisan ballots cast).

For the general election, turnout was 52.61%, with 3,219,122 ballots cast.

Straight-ticket voting
Illinois had a straight-ticket voting option in 1994.

Federal elections

United States House 

All Illinois seats in the United States House of Representatives were up for election in 1994.

The Republican Party flipped two seats from the Democratic Party. Among the two Democrats unseated by Republicans was Ways and Means Chairman Dan Rostenkowski, who had been in congress since 1959. This left the party composition of Illinois' House delegation 10 Democrats and 10 Republicans.

State elections

Governor and Lieutenant Governor

Incumbent Governor Jim Edgar, a Republican, won reelection in the greatest landslide in Illinois history, excepting the election of 1818. Edgar carried 101 of the state's 102 counties over the Democratic nominee, State Comptroller Dawn Clark Netsch, with Netsch only winning Gallatin County. To date, this is the most recent statewide election in which Cook County voted for the Republican candidate.

Attorney General 

Incumbent Attorney General Roland Burris, a Democrat, did not run for a second term, instead opting (ultimately unsuccessfully) to seek the Democratic nomination for governor. Republican Jim Ryan was elected to succeed him in office.

Democratic primary
Attorney and 1992 U.S. Senate candidate Al Hofeld won the Democratic primary, defeating former Chicago alderman Martin J. Oberman.

Republican primary
Former Secretary of State Jim Ryan won the Republican primary, defeating Metra Chairman Jeffrey Ladd and attorney Themis Anagost. Ryan had been the unsuccessful Republican nominee for attorney general in 1990.

General election

Secretary of State 

Incumbent Secretary of State George Ryan was reelected to a second term. , this was the last time a Republican was elected Illinois Secretary of State.

Democratic primary
Treasurer of Illinois Pat Quinn won the Democratic primary, defeating Illinois State Senator Denny Jacobs and Larouche movement member Rose-Marie Love.

Originally, Kane County Coroner Mary Lou Kearns had also declared herself a candidate for the Democratic nomination for Secretary of State, but she subsequently decided to instead run for Comptroller.

Republican primary
Incumbent George Ryan ran unopposed in the Republican primary.

General election

Comptroller 

Incumbent Comptroller Dawn Clark Netsch, a Democrat, did not seek reelection to a second term, instead opting to run for governor. Republican Loleta Didrickson was elected to succeed her in office.

Democratic primary
Illinois State Senator Earlean Collins defeated Kane County Coroner/Kane County Democratic Party Chairwoman Mary Lou Kearns, Lyons Township Assessor Edward J. Schumann, and Larouche movement member Mark Bender.

Republican primary

General election

Treasurer 

Incumbent Treasurer Pat Quinn, a Democrat, did not run for a second term, instead opting to run for Secretary of State. Republican Judy Baar Topinka was elected to succeed him in office.

Democratic primary
Metropolitan Water Reclamation District board member defeated Thomas J. Beaudette in the Democratic primary.

Republican primary
Illinois State Senator Judy Baar Topinka won the Republican primary, running unopposed.

General election

State Senate
Some of the seats of the Illinois Senate were up for election in 1994. Republicans retained control of the Illinois Senate, which they had captured a majority in during the preceding 1992 elections.

State House of Representatives
All of the seats in the Illinois House of Representatives were up for election in 1994. Republicans flipped control of the Illinois House of Representatives.

Trustees of the University of Illinois

An election was held for three of nine seats for Trustees of the University of Illinois system for six-year terms.

This was the last election for  Trustees of University of Illinois, as this would subsequently become an appointed office.

The election saw the reelection of incumbent Republican Judith Reese to a second term, as well as the election of new trustees Republican Bill Engelbrecht and Democrat Martha R. O'Malley.

First-term incumbent Democrat Ken Boyle lost reelection. First-term incumbent Republican Donald W. Grabowski was not nominated for reelection.

Judicial elections
Multiple judicial positions were up for election in 1994.

Ballot measures
Illinois voters voted on a two ballot measures in 1994, both of them legislatively referred constitutional amendment In order to be approved, the measures required either 60% support among those specifically voting on the amendment or 50% support among all ballots cast in the elections.

Illinois Criminal Defendants' Right to Meet Witnesses Amendment
Voters approved the Illinois Criminal Defendants' Right to Meet Witnesses Amendment (also known as "Amendment 1"), a legislatively referred constitutional amendment which amended Article I, Section 8 of the Constitution of Illinois, which allowed criminal defendants be given the right to be confronted by witnesses.

Illinois Legislative Session Length Amendment
Voters approved Illinois Legislative Session Length (also known as "Amendment 2"), a legislatively referred constitutional amendment which amended Article IV, Section 10 of the Constitution of Illinois to change the legislative adjournment date from June 20 to May 3.

Local elections
Local elections were held. These included county elections, such as the Cook County elections.

References